Wallace was a New Zealand parliamentary electorate. It was established in 1858, the first election held in 1859, and existed until 1996. For a time, it was represented by two members. In total, there were 18 Members of Parliament from the Wallace electorate.

Population centres
The initial 24 New Zealand electorates were defined by Governor George Grey in March 1853, based on the New Zealand Constitution Act 1852 that had been passed by the British government. The Constitution Act also allowed the House of Representatives to establish new electorates, and this was first done in 1858, when four new electorates were formed by splitting existing electorates. Wallace was one of those four electorates, and it was established by splitting the  electorate. Settlements in the initial area were Invercargill, Gore, Mataura, and Riverton.

This electorate was in the rural part of Southland.

History
The first election was held on 30 November 1859 during the term of the 2nd New Zealand Parliament, and was won by Dillon Bell. The electorate was named after Scottish military hero William Wallace.

For the term of the 3rd New Zealand Parliament (1861–66), it was a two-member electorate. From 1866 to its dissolution in 1996, it was a single-member electorate.

In 1938 additional areas added from Central Otago and the West Coast made Wallace the biggest (non-Māori) electorate in New Zealand.

In the 1996 election, the first MMP election, the electorate was combined with the adjacent Clutha electorate into the Clutha-Southland electorate.

Members of Parliament
Key

Single-member electorate

Multi-member electorate

Single-member electorate

Election results

1993 election

1990 election

1987 election

1984 election

1981 election

1978 election

1975 election

1972 election

1969 election

1966 election

1963 election

1960 election

1957 election

1954 election

1951 election

1949 election

1946 election

1943 election

1938 election

1935 election

1931 election

1928 election

1925 election

1922 election

1919 election

1914 election

1899 election

1896 election

1890 election

1875 by-election

Notes

References

Historical electorates of New Zealand
Politics of Southland, New Zealand
1858 establishments in New Zealand
1996 disestablishments in New Zealand